Perunović is a surname. Notable people with the surname include:

Miodrag Perunović (born 1957), Montenegrin boxer and poet
Petar Perunović (1880–1952), guslar
Slađana Perunović (born 1984), long-distance runner

Serbian surnames